Corporate sponsorship of domestic league of rugby league in England dates back to the 1980s.

History
The first competition to be sponsored was the Challenge Cup in 1980 when the Rugby Football League (RFL) signed a five-year deal with State Express.

Super League

The Super League has been sponsored every year apart from 2013 when it was known as Super League 2013 or Super League XVIII.

1986–1997: Slalom Lager and Stones Bitter
The RFL Championship became the first domestic competition to be sponsored in 1980, along with the Challenge Cup sponsorship, signing a deal with Slalom Lager becoming known as the Slalom Lager Championship. In 1986, a new sponsorship deal was signed with Stones Bitter changing the league's name once again to the Stones Bitter Championship. This deal ran until 1997 and the league was named Stones Super League in 1996 when the Super League was founded.

1998–1999: JJB Sports
JJB Sports signed a two-year deal to sponsor the Super League in 1998. The league became known as the JJB Super League. It was the first Super League season to have a playoff and Grand Final which was also named the JJB Super League Grand Final. JJB also sponsor Wigan Warriors and had the naming rights to their stadium.

2000–2004: Tetley's
Tetley's Bitter became the third sponsor of the Super League after they signed a five-year deal in 2000 to become the Tetley's Super League. Like the JJB deal, Tetley's also had the naming rights to the Super League Playoffs and Grand Final. They also sponsored Leeds Rhinos who went on to win the 2004 Grand Final. Tetley's later went on the sponsor the Challenge Cup in 2013 and 2014.

2005–2011: Engage Mutual Assurance
In 2005 the Super League signed its longest deal to date with Engage Mutual Assurance, thus becoming the Engage Super League. The deal lasted six years, and included the naming rights to Super League, playoffs and Grand Final. Engage continued their relationship with rugby league in 2012 by sponsoring the referees.

2012: Stobart
In 2012 the Super League signed a unique three-year deal with Stobart Group, with the option to opt out after 12 months. The deal included naming rights thus becoming the Stobart Super League. The Stobart logo did not appear on teams kits or anywhere on the pitch including the post cuisines. No cash was invoked in the deal but Super League players and logo was advertised on 100 Stobart lorries across the country. Super League clubs and players criticised the RFL for turning down a cash deal from a betting company and after the 2012 season the RFL activated to opt out clause in the contract, despite TV audiences rising 45% and match day attendance's reaching record highs. The RFL failed to find a sponsor for 2013.

2014–2016: First Utility
In 2014 a three-year deal was signed with utility firm First Utility, the First Utility Super League, thought to be worth around £750,000 a year (£2,250,000 in total), which was around the same amount as the Engage deal between 2005 and 2011. The First Utility sponsorship also included a major redesign of the competitions logo.

2017–2019: Betfred
Betfred became the first bookmakers to sponsor Super League after a U-turn by the RFL who rejected an offer from Betfair in 2012. The deal is believed to be worth between £850,000 and £900,000 a year with the name becoming the Betfred Super League.

The Championships

The Championships were formed in 2003 as the National Leagues and renamed the Championships in 2008. Championship 1 (tier 3) was renamed League 1 in 2015.

2003–2008: LHF Healthplan
In 2003 the RFL signed a five-year deal with LHF to sponsor the then National Leagues 1 and 2, the second and third division of British rugby league. The divisions became known as the LHF Healthplan National Leagues.

2009–2012: Cooperative
After the LHF deal expired the National Leagues were renamed the Championship and Championship 1 together being known as the Rugby League Championships. A deal was then negotiated with the Cooperative Group for the naming rights, Cooperative Championships and newly established playoffs and Grand Final.

2013–2016: Kingstone Press
A new deal was negotiated with Cider company Kingstone Press. The RFL negotiated other deal with Kingstone Press including England sponsorship and secondary Super League sponsors along with the NCL deal.

National Conference League

The National Conference League was founded in 1986 and three more divisions were added to it throughout the 90s and 2000s.

1997–2011: Cooperative
The Cooperative Group began its long association with rugby leagues lower divisions with the NCL in 1997, signing an 11-year deal for the title sponsorship. The Co-op later sponsored the Championship and League 1.

2012–2017: Kingstone Press
Kingstone Press Cider began their association with rugby league by sponsoring all four divisions of the NCL signing a five-year deal for the naming rights. In 2013 they also sponsored the Championship and League 1 as the Cooperative did during their sponsorship.

2018-2019: Betfred
In 2018, Betfred were announced as sponsors of the Championship and League 1 as well as their sponsorship of Super League. They signed a two year deal.

Challenge Cup

1980–1985: State Express
In 1980 the RFL signed their first sponsorship deal with cigarette brand State Express 555 for the naming rights of the Challenge Cup. It was the first sponsorship deal in rugby league along with the RFL Championship being sponsored by Slalom Larger the same year.

1985–2001: Silk Cut
In 1985 Silk Cut became the last cigarette brand to sponsor a major tournament in rugby. It was also the longest sponsorship deal in rugby league, lasting for 16 years.

2002–2003: Kellogg's
In 2002 after the long term Silk Cut deal ended, the RFL were quick to find a new title sponsor for their flagship cup competition. They signed a short term two-year deal with Kellogg's for the naming rights, the cup now becoming the Kellogg's Nutri-Grain Challenge Cup.

2004–2007: Powergen
In 2004 the RFL signed a new long term 4-year deal with energy supplier Powergen. Powergen were the title sponsor when the final was played at the new Wembley for the first time and Catalans Dragons became the first French, and non English side, to reach a Challenge Cup Final.

2008–2012: Leeds Metropolitan Carnegie
In 2008 Leeds Met Carnegie became the title sponsors of the Challenge Cup, signing a five-year deal for the competition to be known as the Carnegie Challenge Cup.

2013–2014: Tetley's
Leeds Met Carnegie ended their long association with the Cup in 2012. The RFL were qui to find a new title sponsor and did so with Tetley's Bitter continuing their long term association with rugby league by signing a two-year deal.

2015–2017: Ladbrokes
Ladbrokes became the first betting company to sponsor a rugby league competition after the RFL took a U-turn on betting companies sponsoring major competitions after they turned down a cash deal with Betfair to sponsor the Super League in 2012.

Sponsors
The first British competition to be sponsored was the Challenge Cup in 1980 and was sponsored by State Express and was then known as the State Express Challenge Cup. The Super League has been sponsored every season since 1996 with the exception of the 2013 season.

See also

Australian rugby league sponsorship

References

Sports sponsorships
Rugby league in England